The Hamiltonian Monte Carlo algorithm (originally known as hybrid Monte Carlo) is a Markov chain Monte Carlo method for obtaining a sequence of random samples which converge to being distributed according to a target probability distribution for which direct sampling is difficult. This sequence can be used to estimate integrals with respect to the target distribution (expected values).

Hamiltonian Monte Carlo corresponds to an instance of the Metropolis–Hastings algorithm, with a Hamiltonian dynamics evolution simulated using a time-reversible and volume-preserving numerical integrator (typically the leapfrog integrator) to propose a move to a new point in the state space. Compared to using a Gaussian random walk proposal distribution in the Metropolis–Hastings algorithm, Hamiltonian Monte Carlo reduces the correlation between successive sampled states by proposing moves to distant states which maintain a high probability of acceptance due to the approximate energy conserving properties of the simulated Hamiltonian dynamic when using a symplectic integrator. The reduced correlation means fewer Markov chain samples are needed to approximate integrals with respect to the target probability distribution for a given Monte Carlo error. 

The algorithm was originally proposed by Simon Duane, Anthony Kennedy, Brian Pendleton and Duncan Roweth in 1987 for calculations in lattice quantum chromodynamics. In 1996, Radford M. Neal showed how the method could be used for a broader class of statistical problems, in particular artificial neural networks. However, the burden of having to supply gradients of the respective densities delayed the wider adoption of the algorithm in statistics and other quantitative disciplines, until in the mid-2010s the developers of Stan implemented HMC in combination with automatic differentiation.

Algorithm

The Hamilton's equations are

and

Let  be a mass matrix which is symmetric and positive definite, then the Hamiltonian is

where  is the potential energy. The potential energy for a target is given as

which comes from the Boltzmann's factor.

The algorithm requires a positive integer for number of leap frog steps  and a positive number for the step size . Let . Next, the particle will run under Hamiltonian dynamics for time , this is done by solving the Hamilton's equations numerically using the leap frog algorithm. The position and momentum vectors after time  using the leap frog algorithm are

The leap frog algorithm is an approximate solution to the motion of non-interacting classical particles. If exact, the solution will never change the initial randomly-generated energy distribution, as energy is conserved for each particle in the presence of a classical potential energy field. In order to reach a thermodynamic equilibrium distribution, particles must have some sort of interaction with, for example, a surrounding heat bath, so that the entire system can take on different energies with probabilities according to the Boltzmann distribution.

One way to move the system towards a thermodynamic equilibrium distribution is to change the state of the particles using the Metropolis–Hastings. So first, one applies the leap frog step, then a Metropolis-Hastings step.

where

This is repeated to obtain .

No U-Turn Sampler
The No U-Turn Sampler (NUTS) is an extension by controlling  automatically. Tuning  is critical. For  too large, the particle will oscillate and thus waste computational time. For  too small, the particle will behave like a random walk.

Loosely, NUTS runs the Hamiltonian dynamics both forwards and backwards in time randomly until a U-Turn condition is satisfied. When that happens, a random point from the path is chosen for the MCMC sample and the process is repeated from that new point.

In detail, a binary tree is constructed to trace the path of the leap frog steps. To produce a MCMC sample, an iterative procedure is conducted. A slice variable  is sampled. Let  and  be the position and momentum of the forward particle respectively. In each iteration, the binary tree selects at random uniformly to move the forward particle forwards in time or the backward particle backwards in time. Also for each iteration, the number of leap frog steps increase by a factor of 2. For example, in the first iteration, the forward particle moves forwards in time using 1 leap frog step. In the next iteration, the backward particle moves backwards in time using 2 leap frog steps.

The iterative procedure continues until the U-Turn condition is met, that is

or when the Hamiltonian becomes inaccurate

or

where, for example, .

Once the U-Turn condition is met, the next MCMC sample, is obtained by sampling uniformly the leap frog path traced out by the binary tree  which satisfies

This is usually satisfied if the remaining HMC parameters are sensible.

See also
 Dynamic Monte Carlo method
 Software for Monte Carlo molecular modeling
 Stan
 Metropolis-adjusted Langevin algorithm

References

Further reading

External links 
 
 
Hamiltonian Monte Carlo from scratch
Optimization and Monte Carlo Methods

Monte Carlo methods  
Markov chain Monte Carlo